Fikret Israfil Oglu Sideifzade (born 1 January 1952) is an Azerbaijani chess International Master (IM). He played in the Azerbaijani team at the European Team Chess Championships in Pula in 1997 and in Plovdiv in 2003.

Sideifzade was five-time champion of Azerbaijan SSR (1974, 1976, 1977, 1979, 1984).

References

External links 

Chess players from Baku
1952 births
Living people
20th-century chess players
Soviet chess players
Azerbaijani chess players
Chess International Masters
Sportspeople from Baku
Chess coaches